Elymnias esaca is a butterfly in the family Nymphalidae. It was described by John Obadiah Westwood in 1851. It is found in the Indomalayan realm.

Subspecies
E. e. esaca (Peninsular Malaysia, Singapore)
E. e. egialina (C. & R. Felder, 1863) (Philippines: Luzon, Mindoro)
E. e. borneensis Wallace, 1869 (North Borneo)
E. e. andersonii (Moore, 1886) (South Burma: Mergui)
E. e. maheswara Fruhstorfer, 1895 (Java, Bali)
E. e. leontina Fruhstorfer, 1898 (Nias)
E. e. pseudodelias Fruhstorfer, 1907 (Sumatra)
E. e. taeniola Fruhstorfer, 1907 (Southeast Borneo)
E. e. georgi Fruhstorfer, 1907 (Philippines: Mindanao)
E. e. saifuli Hanafusa, 1994 (Siberut)
E. e. popularis Hanafusa, 1994 (Tanahmasa)
E. e. lautensis Tateishi, 2001 (Laut Island)
E. e. splendida Tateishi, 2001 (Singkep Island)
E. e. lingga Tateishi, 2001 (Lingga Island)
E. e. nigricans Tateishi, 2001 (Enggano Island)

References

External links
"Elymnias Hübner, 1818" at Markku Savela's Lepidoptera and Some Other Life Forms

Elymnias
Butterflies described in 1851